Eduardo 'Edu' Espada Gallardo (born 8 March 1981) is a retired Spanish footballer who played as a striker.

Club career
In his country, Espada never played in higher than Segunda División B. He represented seven teams in the category, his best year being with Talavera CF in 2005–06 when he topped group IV's scoring charts to help his team to the 14th position; he also competed in that level with Mérida UD, Ciudad de Murcia, Zamora CF, UD Marbella, Racing de Ferrol, Águilas CF, CF Atlético Ciudad and Écija Balompié.

In July 2010, Espada signed for Romanian club FCM Târgu Mureş as a free agent. However, after only a few months with the Liga I side, he returned to his country, joining another team in division three, Ontinyent CF.

References

External links
 
 Futbolme profile  
 

1981 births
Living people
People from Sierra Sur (Seville)
Sportspeople from the Province of Seville
Spanish footballers
Footballers from Andalusia
Association football forwards
Segunda División B players
Mérida UD footballers
Ciudad de Murcia footballers
Zamora CF footballers
Marbella FC players
Racing de Ferrol footballers
Écija Balompié players
Ontinyent CF players
CD Guijuelo footballers
Liga I players
ASA 2013 Târgu Mureș players
Spanish expatriate footballers
Expatriate footballers in Romania
Spanish expatriate sportspeople in Romania